Celeste Mucci (born 11 August 1999) is an Australian athlete. She competed in the women's 4 × 100 metres relay event at the 2019 World Athletics Championships.

Mucci won the 100m hurdles at the 2022 Oceania Championships and competed in that event, finishing seventh in the final, at the 2022 Commonwealth Games held in Birmingham, England. It was her second Commonwealth Games having competed in the heptathlon in 2018, finishing fourth. Mucci won the Australian national championships in heptathlon in 2018 and 2019.

References

External links
 
 Celeste Mucci at Athletics Australia

1999 births
Living people
Australian female sprinters
Place of birth missing (living people)
World Athletics Championships athletes for Australia
Australian Athletics Championships winners
Universiade medalists in athletics (track and field)
Universiade silver medalists for Australia